Mike Taibbi (born c. 1949) is an American television journalist best known for his work at NBC News.

He retired in 2014, having covered, among other events, the wars in Iraq and Afghanistan. During his career, Taibbi also worked at CBS News. He is the recipient of an Emmy Award and a four-time recipient of the prestigious Edward R. Murrow Award.

Early life and education
Taibbi was born Loren Ames Denny to a Filipino-Hawaiian mother, Camila Salinas, in Hawaii, about 1949. At the age of seven or eight he was adopted by Salvatore and Gaetana Taibbi (whose surname is of Sicilian and Lebanese origin). Thereafter, he took the name Mike Taibbi, and was raised in Malverne, New York, a Long Island suburb of New York City.
 After high school, Taibbi attended Rutgers University. He graduated in 1971 with degrees in journalism and sociology. Taibbi attended the University of Chicago Law School.

Career
In 1989, with Anna Sims-Phillips, Taibbi co-wrote Unholy Alliances: Working the Tawana Brawley Story, which explored the discredited Tawana Brawley rape allegations.

Early in his career, Taibbi worked in local television news in Boston and New York City. Subsequently, he worked at both ABC News and CBS News before joining NBC News, in 1997, to work on Dateline NBC. In the early 2000s, Taibbi reported on the Iraq and Afghanistan Wars for NBC News.

Personal life
Taibbi is married to Siobhan Walsh. His son, Matt Taibbi, is a well-known independent journalist, media critic, and former contributing editor at Rolling Stone.

References

Living people
People from Malverne, New York
Mike
Journalists from Hawaii
Journalists from New York (state)
Writers from Hawaii
Writers from New York City
American television reporters and correspondents
American non-fiction crime writers
American war correspondents
American people of Filipino descent
American people of Native Hawaiian descent
New York (state) television reporters
ABC News personalities
CBS News people
NBC News people
Emmy Award winners
Rutgers University alumni
20th-century American writers
21st-century American non-fiction writers
Date of birth missing (living people)
Year of birth missing (living people)
Place of birth missing (living people)